Jayedar Rural District is a rural district (dehestan) in the Central District of Pol-e Dokhtar County, Lorestan Province, Iran. At the 2006 census, its population was 10,727, in 2,227 families.  The rural district has 28 villages.

References 

Rural Districts of Lorestan Province
Pol-e Dokhtar County